The Echuca Football Netball Club, nicknamed the Murray Bombers, is an Australian rules football and netball club based in the Victorian town of Echuca, Victoria.

History
The Echuca Football Club was formed in 1874, so it could play against the Rochester Football Club which was also formed in 1874 too.

Echuca initially wore the blue and white colours.

In 1890, Echuca won the Aitken Tropy, then 1891, Echuca East Football Club won the trophy, then in 1892, Rochester won the initial premiership and Echuca protested, which resulted in the two teams having to play a grand final match.  Rochester refused to play, with Echuca travelling over to Rochester to play, but with no competing team, Echuca claimed the premiership match, after the first bounce. After much discussion, Echuca was officially declared premiers. 

Echuca played many matches against East Echuca Football Club in the mid to late 1890's. 

The club teams currently compete in the Goulburn Valley Football League (GVFL), having initially joined in 1909. Echuca also played in the Bendigo Football League, from 1925 until 1939, then from 1949 until they returned to the GVFL in 1974. 

Echuca played in the Echuca Football League from 1946 to 1948, winning three consecutive premierships, before returning to the Bendigo Football League.

One well known ex-player is former Victorian police officer Ron Iddles.

Competitions Timelines
 1890 - 1892 - Echuca District Football Association (Aitken Trophy)
 1894 - 19?? - Northern Football Association (Upton Trophy)
 1909 - 1923 - Goulburn Valley Football League
 1924 - 1939 - Bendigo Football League
 1940 - 1945 - Club in recess. World War Two
 1946 - 1948 - Echuca Football League
 1949 - 1973 - Bendigo Football League
 1974 - 2022 - Goulburn Valley Football League

Football Premierships
Seniors

Reserves
Bendigo Football League
 1969
Goulburn Valley Football League
 1975, 1976, 1977, 1978, 1995, 1996, 2007

Thirds
Goulburn Valley Football League
 1976, 1994, 2008, 2018, 2019

Echuca East Football Club
Echuca Football Association
1891
Norther District Football Association
1894, 1895

Football League best & fairest winners
Seniors
Bendigo Football League: Michelsen Medal
1954 - Eddie Jackson
1963 - Bob Vagg
1965 - Bill Serong

Goulburn Valley Football League: Morrison Medal 
 1986 - B.A. Kennaugh  
 1995 - Simon Eishold  
 1997 - Steven Orr  
 2001 - Craig Sholl 
 2003 - Rhys Archard              
 2006 - Colin Durie 
 2010 - Kristian Height
 2016 - Simon Buckley 
 2017 - Simon Buckley

Reserves
Bendigo Football League
 1960 - Len Johnston
 1961 - Paul Egan & Robert Egan
 1963 - Noel Wallace

Senior Football Coaches

References

External links

 Twitter page
 SportsTG site
 1928 - Bendigo Football League Premiers: Echuca FC team photo
 1948 - Echuca District FA Premiers: Echuca FC team photo

Australian rules football clubs in Victoria (Australia)
Sports clubs established in 1876
Australian rules football clubs established in 1876
1876 establishments in Australia
Goulburn Valley Football League clubs
Netball teams in Victoria (Australia)